The Conservancy Association is a Hong Kong non-governmental organisation founded in 1968.

The organisation focuses on the protection of the environment and the conservation of natural and cultural heritage. It also seeks to enhance the quality of life of both current and future generations, and to ensure that Hong Kong shoulders her regional and global environmental responsibilities. The organisation advocates appropriate policies, monitors government action, promotes environmental education and takes a lead in community participation.

History
In 1967, John H. Pain (1930 - 2018) of Hong Kong Tourist Association, Prof. Brian Loft (1929 - 2015) of the University of Hong Kong, Jeremy Brown of Jardine Matheson and a Scottish lady Agnes Black formed a rambling group called "Bauhina's Circle". Their regard for the Hong Kong countryside came at the right time as the Hong Kong government made plans in 1968 for a "Provisional Council for the Use and Conservation of the Countryside", an idea from a government-commissioned report "Conservation of the Hong Kong Countryside" by Lee M Talbot. The idea of forming an association came during one of these walks when they saw the destruction of the village land. In October 1968, they gathered at Helena May Institute and declared themselves "the Conservancy Association" - thus was born the first ever green group of Hong Kong.

Soon they recruited Robert N. Rayne of the Chinese University of Hong Kong, together with Prof. S. Y. Hu of the Chinese University of Hong Kong, Michael A. Webster, a keen bird-watcher, Sir Lindsay Ride, former Vice Chancellor of Hong Kong University and the others. Father H. Naylor of Wah Yan College, was invited by Robert N. Rayne. They became the founders of the association. In late 1969, it was formally registered as a society. The first Annual General Meeting was held in 1970 and Robert N. Rayne was elected as Chairman with Michael Webster as Secretary. In 1971, Dr. Ding Lik-kiu was invited by John H. Pain to join the association.

A membership drive and fund raising campaign was then launched. On 11 May 1972, the Conservancy Association published a full-page advertisement on South China Morning Post by listing their "Founding Members".

At a 1972 workshop, members of the association reached a consensus that Hong Kong's countryside was threatened and would "cease to exist in an acceptable form" unless concrete action was taken to protect it. The association also considered pollution in urban areas an imminent threat to public health. It pressed the government to take action to turn Hong Kong from "one of the dirtiest, and potentially unhealthiest, cities in Asia to one of the cleanest, with clean air, clean water, clean streets, and community-conscious people."

Since then, the association positioned itself as a pressure group on environmental issues and launched a series of campaigns. In the early 1970s the association opposed the construction of a petrochemical complex on Lamma Island, proposed by Shell. This proposal was withdrawn in January 1975. Later the same decade, the association opposed the construction of the Lamma Power Station, which was eventually built.

Having enlightened by the discussion of Earth Summit in Stockholm, Father Naylor launched various environmental educational activities to teach local students about environmental protection, including the establishment of "Youth Environmental Action Group" and "School Conservancy Clubs Liaison Board".

From 1977 to 1980, the association worked with "Hong Kong Heritage Society" and launched a series of heritage conservation campaigns, including the conservation of Tsim Sha Tsui Railway Terminal, Victoria Block, Hong Kong Club Building and Supreme Court...etc.

Various campaigns were launched during the 1980s. The Association was a member of the Joint Organisation of the Concerned for Nuclear Energy (JOCNE) and opposed the establishment of the Daya Bay Nuclear Power Plant. Being championed by its member Simon Chau Siu-cheung, the association also launched the "No MSG Campaign" and promote prudent use of plastic bags.

In 1988, the association established the Hong Kong Environmental Centre within its office as the first environmental resource centre open to the public.

Since 1990s, the association worked with other green groups in Hong Kong to campaign against the development of countryside, such as Sha Lo Tung, Nam Sang Wai...etc. The association also advocated the Environmental Impact Assessment Bill and the Nature Conservation Policy.

The "No Fat Choy for good fortune (不吃髮菜齊發財)" movement was launched against the environmental vandalism of the destroy of grassland in mainland China in 2001.

The association opposed the alignment of Lok Ma Chau Spur Line in order to protect Long Valley.

In 2004 the association helped organise a campaign against the plan to tear down Hunghom Peninsula, a brand new housing estate built as Home Ownership Scheme public housing but sold instead to Sun Hung Kai Properties and New World Development following completion. Following a massive backlash and facing a public relations disaster, the developers rescinded the plans and decided to renovate the estate instead.

In 2006, the Conservancy Association's Hong Kong Environment Centre was transformed into the Conservancy Association Centre for Heritage (CACHe).

Major works

Tree conservation 
CA has actively initiated a variety of tree conservation and education works over the past years. Different tree activities included “Arbor Day”, tree appreciation tours, tree risk assessment training workshops, tree-scapes and wall trees photo competitions etc. were organized to raise the public awareness on tree appreciation as well as the importance of urban forestry.

Apart from urban trees, CA also focus on woodlands in countryside. CA has participated in several tree planting schemes, organized tree planting activities in different hillsides, not only to provide chances for public to participate into tree works, but also to improve ecological values of local woodland habitats.

Nature conservation 
The Conservancy Association considers that natural and cultural heritage is an invaluable public asset, belonging to the society and posterity. It is part of the "social capitals" of Hong Kong. Management of this asset in a sustainable manner will not only enhance our quality of life, but also contribute substantially to Hong Kong's competitiveness.

Waste reduction and recycling 
CA spares no efforts in the promotion of waste reduction and recycling. We work closely with government departments, property management companies, housing estates, schools and NGOs in organizing educational and recycling programmes for different audiences, aiming to encourage the general public to achieve waste reduction in daily lives.

Environmental education 
Community education work is one of the tasks that CA pays attention to. Other than Talks and Guided Tours in traditional formats, education activities provided by CA tend to be diversified , such as green mass games, drama-in-education activities, children's stories, carnivals, Liberal Studies discussion and facilities visits etc., covering a variety of audience from kindergarten kids, primary, secondary & tertiary students and families. Through different experiences, participants could learn to know the natural environment and be more willing to protect environment.

Publications 

 SOS Magazine, vol 1–7, 1973–1981
 Green Alert Magazine
 CA Newsletter, 1987-now

Presidents and chairman
Presidents
 L. K. Ding, 1976 – 1980
 Ng Cho-nam, 1999-2000 

Chairmen
 Robert N. Rayne, 1973
 L.K. Ding, 1973 – 1975
 Jeremiah K. H. Wong, 1976 – 1977
 Michael A. Webster, 1977 – 1979
 Wan Shek-luen, 1979 – 1986
 Hung Wing-tat,MH, 1986 – 1991
 Fung Shiu-wing, 1991 – 1995
 Ng Cho-nam, 1995 -1999, 2000-2019
 Gordon T. L. Ng, 1999 – 2001
 Albert K.T. Lai, 2001 – 2005
 Betty S.F. Ho, 2005 – 2009
 K.L. Lam, JP, 2019 – 2013
 Lucy K. P. Woo, 2013 – 2017
 W.T. Yan, 2017 – present

Fundraising activities 

 Environment Expedition Walkathon (1974–1980)
 Walk for the Environment (1991–2012)
 Eco Race (2002 - 2006)
Green Rider (2013-2014) 
Eco-Rangers (2015–present) 
Green Builder 
Flag Day

References

External links

 

1968 establishments in Hong Kong
Nature conservation organisations based in Asia
Environmental organisations based in Hong Kong
Environmental organizations established in 1968